Isa Khel is a sub-tribe of the Pashtun tribe, Niazi. The earliest recorded mention of the isa khel tribe is in Baburnama, 1504-1505. Most of the tribe still resides in their ancestral town of Isakhel,  named after their ancestor Isa Khan Niazi son of Umar Khan Niazi, but a lot have shifted to bigger cities or different towns in pursuit of a better education and better opportunities.

Clans
 Zakku Kheyl Many in the southern area of Isakhel belong to this clan, most influential due to their substantial agriculture land.
 Mammu Khel This tribe mainly live in southern suburbs and villages of Isakhel comprising 60% population of Isa Khel sub-tribe. The names of their villages are Khaglanwala, Behu, Sarwar Khel, Wandha Ghalay Khel, Attock Paniala, and Khira in Lukki Marwat District. A notable sub-clan is Khizar Khel
 Appoo Khel People of this clan live in Isakhel city with unchanged name of Appo Khel
 Badunzye People of this clan live in the southern villages of Isa Khel city. Maulana Abdusattar Khan Niazi belonged to this particular clan.

Notable people
 Badie Ur Rehman Khan son of Abdul Rauf Khan,
Leader Of The Khan Tribe
 Abdul Sattar Khan Niazi, religious and political leader
 Zakia Shahnawaz Khan, 
Politician
 Abdul Rehman Khan, Politician
 Abdul Hafeez Khan, Politician
 Abdul Razzaq Khan, Politician
 Attaullah Khan Esakhelvi, 
Pakistani folk singer
 Maqbool Ahmed Khan (MNA), Politician
 Col. Mohammad Aslam Khan, Politician

References

Niazi Pashtun tribes
Pashtun tribes